Roger-Bernard-Charles Espagnac de Ramefort (15 August 1775 – 1839), better known as Charles d'Espagnac or, from 1817, Carlos d'Espagne, was a French-born Spanish general who saw distinguished service in the Peninsular War, and as governor of Barcelona, was an opponent of Spanish liberals. In his letters and dispatches, Wellington refers to him as Carlos de España.

He fought at the Battle of the Gebora, and was wounded fighting under the orders of General Beresford at the Battle of Albuera. In March 1812, he was wounded again at the Siege of Badajoz, fighting under the orders of Wellington, under whose orders he also fought at Salamanca. He was again wounded at the Siege of Pamplona in 1813.

He was briefly governor of Madrid before returning to the battlefield at the Battle of Bayonne and at Vitoria, where he was again wounded.

He was murdered by Catalan Carlists while crossing a bridge over the river Segre, near Organya, and his body was thrown into the river with a stone around his neck.

References

1775 births
1839 deaths
Spanish generals
Spanish commanders of the Napoleonic Wars
 people murdered in Spain
Spanish murder victims